Iman Salimi (born 1 June 1996) is an Iranian professional footballer who plays as a centre-back for Persian Gulf Pro League club Gol Gohar F.C. .

Club career

ŠKF Sereď
On 2 February 2021, Salimi signed a 3-month contract with Fortuna Liga club Sereď. It was his first career stop outside of his home country.

International career
Salimi has represented Iran at under-17 and under-19 levels, including representing Iran at the 2013 FIFA U-17 World Cup.

Career statistics

References

1996 births
Living people
People from Kermanshah
Sportspeople from Kermanshah
Iranian footballers
Iran youth international footballers
Iran under-20 international footballers
Association football defenders
Aluminium Hormozgan F.C. players
Fajr Sepasi players
Pars Jonoubi Jam players
Tractor S.C. players
ŠKF Sereď players
Azadegan League players
Persian Gulf Pro League players
Slovak Super Liga players
Iranian expatriate footballers
Expatriate footballers in Slovakia
Iranian expatriate sportspeople in Slovakia